is a Japanese actor and voice actor debuting in Triton of the Sea (1972). He has done some voice directing in such anime as Basilisk: The Kouga Ninja Scrolls Ryota Miyagi in Slam Dunk and JoJo's Bizarre Adventure. His real name is Tsubasa Shioya (written with the same kanji). His older brother is voice actor Kōzō Shioya.

Biography

Filmography

Television animation
Triton of the Sea (1972) (Triton)
Science Ninja Team Gatchaman (1972) (Jinpei the Swallow)
Space Runaway Ideon (1980) (Cosmo Yuki)
Ashita no Joe 2 (1981) (Jirō Shioya)
Star Musketeer Bismark (1984) (Shinji Hikari)
Saint Seiya (1986) (Siren Sorento)
Transformers: Super-God Masterforce (1988) (Buster)
Kariage-kun (1989) (Kariage-kun)
Transformers: Victory (1989) (Hellbat)
Goldfish Warning! (1991) (Syuichi Kitada)
Nangoku Shōnen Papuwa-kun (1992) (Gionkamen Arashiyama)
Sailor Moon (1992) (Misha)
Slam Dunk (1993) (Ryota Miyagi)
Rurouni Kenshin (1996) (Dr. Oguni Gensai)
Cowboy Bebop (1999) (Miles)
JoJo's Bizarre Adventure: Phantom Blood (2012) (Will A. Zeppeli)
Kirakira PreCure a la Mode (2017) (Noir)
Xuan Yuan Sword Luminary (2018) (An Ce)

Theatrical animation
Mobile Suit Gundam (1981) (Marker)
Doraemon: Nobita's Little Star Wars (Freedom Alliance member)
Mobile Suit Gundam F91 (1991) (Birgit Pirjo)
Perfect Blue (1998) (Takao Shibuya)

OVAs
Legend of the Galactic Heroes (1989) (Graf Alfred von Lansberg)
Mobile Suit Gundam 0083: Stardust Memory (1991) (Nick Orville)

Tokusatsu
Akuma-kun (1966) (ep. 13)
Spectreman (1971) (Tamio, Jun Hayata) (ep. 34 - 35 (Tamio), 59 - 60(Jun Hayata))
Silver Kamen Giant (1972) (boy) (ep. 23)
Barom-1 (1972) (Tetsuya, Tooru) (ep. 14 (Tetsuya), 35 (Tooru))
Iron King (1973) (boy) (ep. 24)
Seijuu Sentai Gingaman (1998) (Gaaragaara) (ep. 31)
Uchu Sentai Kyuranger (2017) (Ikargen) (ep. 6 - 9, 11 - 12)

Video games
JoJo's Bizarre Adventure: All Star Battle (2013) (Will A. Zeppeli)
JoJo's Bizarre Adventure: Eyes of Heaven (2015) (Will A. Zeppeli)
JoJo's Bizarre Adventure: All Star Battle R (2022) (Will A. Zeppeli)

Dubbing

Live-action film
The Burning (1985 Fuji TV edition) (Alfred (Brian Backer))
Encino Man (Stanley "Stoney" Brown (Pauly Shore))
Lucky Stars Go Places (Top Dog (Alan Tam))
Mr. Vampire (Chau-sang (Chin Siu-ho))
Red Dawn (Danny (Brad Savage))

Animation
An Extremely Goofy Movie (Bobby)
Christine (1990 TV Asahi edition) (Arnold "Arnie" Cunningham (Keith Gordon))
Evilspeak (Stanley Coopersmith (Clint Howard))
Murmur of the Heart (Laurent Chevalier (Benoît Ferreux))
Executive Decision (Dennis Cahill(Oliver Platt))

Live action television
CHiPs (Bruce Nelson (Bruce Penhall))
The Greatest American Hero (Paco Rodriguez (Don Cervantes))

Teenage Mutant Ninja Turtles (Donatello)
The Transformers (Reflector)
Transformers: Prime (Fast Willy)
Johnny Test (Dukey)
Rwby (Tyrian)
''Peanuts (Linus Vampert) -->

References

External links
Official agency profile 

1958 births
Living people
Japanese male child actors
Japanese male television actors
Japanese male video game actors
Japanese male voice actors
Male voice actors from Kagoshima Prefecture
Male voice actors from Kanagawa Prefecture
Voice actors from Kawasaki, Kanagawa
20th-century Japanese male actors
21st-century Japanese male actors